Wind power has been growing in the United States since the 1970s.

History
The growth of wind power in the United States has been enhanced by a production tax credit (PTC), which pays 2.3¢/kWh for the first 10 years. Development has been off and on again due to the expiration and late renewal of the PTC. It expired at the end of 2013, only to be restored in December 2014. In 2015 it was renewed but is phased out over a five-year period. One of the goals set by the Department of Energy is to increase the number of states which have over 1,000 MW of wind power to 15 by 2018. By the end of 2015 there were 17. Another goal was to increase the number of states with at least 100 MW to 30 by 2010. As of 2011, there are 29. The 2015 vision for wind calls for 10% generation by wind by 2020 (113 GW), 30% by 2030 (224 GW), and 35% by 2050 (404 GW). It calls for 40 states to each have at least 1 GW, and wind power in all 50 states. Larger wind turbines has expanded the commercial viability of wind to all 50 states. Analysts expect 25 GW more between 2016-18. Wind power became the largest generating source of renewable electricity in the USA in 2019.

Wind power by year

Generation

The United States uses approximately 4 million GWh/year.

See also
Wind power in the United States
Renewable energy in the United States
List of U.S. states by electricity production from renewable sources

References

History of technology
Wind power in the United States
History of energy